Sergey Naumik (born 8 October 1985) is a Kazakhstani biathlete. He was born in the West Kazakhstan Province. He competed at the Biathlon World Championships 2010, 2011, 2012 and 2013, and at the 2014 Winter Olympics in Sochi, in sprint, pursuit and individual.

References

External links
 

1985 births
Living people
Biathletes at the 2014 Winter Olympics
Kazakhstani male biathletes
Olympic biathletes of Kazakhstan
Asian Games medalists in biathlon
Biathletes at the 2007 Asian Winter Games
Asian Games bronze medalists for Kazakhstan
Medalists at the 2007 Asian Winter Games
21st-century Kazakhstani people